Nicolás Falero (11 January 1921 – 1986) was a Uruguayan footballer. He played in twelve matches for the Uruguay national football team from 1945 to 1948. He was part of Uruguay's squad for the 1945 South American Championship.

References

External links
 

1921 births
1986 deaths
Uruguayan footballers
Uruguay international footballers
Association football forwards
Footballers from Montevideo
Central Español players
Peñarol players
Club Atlético Platense footballers
Uruguayan expatriate footballers
Expatriate footballers in Argentina